Cranocephalites is a Middle Jurassic ammonitid genus named by Spath in 1932 and included in the family Cranoceratidae, superfamily Stephanoceratacea.

Cranocephalites, sometimes considered a subgenus of Arctocephalites which has sharply ribbed inner whorls and a smooth outer whorl, has a constricted eccentric body chamber. It is found in middle Jurassic sediments in  Alaska, Greenland, Novaya-Zemlya, and eastern Siberia.

References

 Treatise on Invertebrate Paleontology, Part L Ammonoidea ; Geological Society of America and Univ of Kansas press, 5th printing, 1990 (p. L301)

Jurassic ammonites
Fossils of Greenland